Squeeze play may refer to:

In games and sports 
 Squeeze play (baseball)
 Squeeze play (bridge)
 Squeeze play (poker)

Arts and media 
 Squeeze Play (album), a 1956 album by John Serry, Sr
 Squeeze Play!, a 1979 comedy film
 "Squeeze Play" (song), by Snoop Dogg
 Squeeze Play (The Price Is Right), a segment game from The Price Is Right
 Squeeze Play (novel), a detective story by Paul Auster, published under the pseudonym Paul Benjamin
 Squeezeplay, a Transformers character in the Headmaster sub-group

Other uses
 Operation Squeeze Play, a 2005 military operation in the Iraq War

See also
 Play (Squeeze album)
 Squeeze (disambiguation)